Nikolay Chernyshevsky (1828–1889) was a Russian revolutionary democrat, philosopher, critic, and socialist.   

Chernyshevsky (masculine), Chernyshevskaya (feminine), or Chernyshevskoye (neuter) may also refer to:
Chernyshevsky District, a district of Zabaykalsky Krai, Russia
Chernyshevsky Urban Settlement, a municipal formation which the Settlement of Chernyshevsky in Mirninsky District of the Sakha Republic, Russia is incorporated as
Chernyshevskoye Urban Settlement, a municipal formation which the urban-type settlement of Chernyshevsk in Chernyshevsky District of Zabaykalsky Krai is incorporated as
Chernyshevsky (inhabited locality) (Chernyshevskaya, Chernyshevskoye), several inhabited localities in Russia
Chernyshevskaya, a station of the Saint Petersburg Metro, Saint Petersburg, Russia